Nedaplatin (INN, marketed under the tradename Aqupla) is a platinum-based antineoplastic drug which is used for cancer chemotherapy.  The complex consists of two ammine ligands and the dianion derived from glycolic acid.

Platinum-based drugs are widely employed as antineoplastic agents, especially cisplatin and carboplatin.  Due to issues of their toxicity and number of cisplatin-resistant cancer cells, other platinum derivatives have been developed.  Nedaplatin is one example of such new drugs.

References

External links 
 
 

Platinum(II) compounds
Platinum-based antineoplastic agents
Ammine complexes